Duzhe is a bimonthly Chinese general interest magazine. It is among the most widely circulated and the leading magazines in the People's Republic of China.

History and profile
Duzhe was first published in Lanzhou in March 1981. The magazine has its headquarters in Lanzhou, and is published on a biweekly basis by the Gansu People's Press. The magazine includes original articles, condensed articles reprinted from other magazines, book excerpts, and collections of jokes, anecdotes, quotations and other short pieces.

During the first half of the 2000s the magazine was published bi-monthly. In 2003 Duzhe was among the top five magazines in China with a circulation of 3,000,000. The same year it was also the fourth best selling magazine in the world, after Reader's Digest, National Geographic and Time.

References

External links
 

1981 establishments in China
Bi-monthly magazines published in China
Biweekly magazines
Magazines published in China
Chinese-language magazines
Magazines established in 1981
Mass media in Lanzhou